Ek Haseena Thi Ek Deewana Tha is a 2017 Indian Hindi-language romantic musical drama film written, produced and directed by Suneel Darshan and stars Shiv Darshan, Natasha Fernandez and Upen Patel in lead roles. The music was composed by Nadeem Saifi.

Plot 
Young and naive Natasha starts a chain of events when she creates a dilemma for herself. She sets off for her destination wedding with fiancé, Sunny, to her ancestral property Mt. Unique Estate, only to fall helplessly in love with its stud farm keeper Devdhar. Consumed by his robust yet poetic, aggressive yet persistent advances, she realises that his arms were the ultimate destination of her dreams. But who really is Devdhar? A conman hired to destroy her bliss, a supernatural being or just a figment of her imagination? Torn between her lover and the one she dares to love, Natasha learns that love is the deadliest deception when she is engulfed in a vortex of devastating upheavals that leaves all those touched by its intensity heart broken and in a state of bewilderment.

Cast
Shiv Darshan as Devdhar
Natasha Fernandez as Natasha
Upen Patel as Sunny
San Mahajan as villain
Soni Kaur as Rita
Dimppy Ramdayal
Krishan Tandon
Lalitmohan Tiwari
Rumi Khan

Production 
The film was shot in the United Kingdom, across several sites including Cornwall, Dartmouth, Cardiff and Manchester.

Soundtrack 

The film's music and lyrics were composed and penned by Nadeem (of Nadeem-Shravan fame). The soundtrack was released on 13 July 2017 by Shree Krishna International, and consists of six songs. The full album is recorded by Palak Muchhal & Yasser Desai. Songs have got more than 800 Million views...

References

External links 

 
 
 
 

2017 films
Indian romantic thriller films
2010s Hindi-language films
Films directed by Suneel Darshan
2010s romantic thriller films